Engine Company No. 2 is a firehouse located at 1313 Washington Street in Hoboken, New Jersey, United States. The firehouse was added to the National Register of Historic Places on March 30, 1984.

History
The Hoboken Land and Improvement Company donated a piece of land on July 18, 1889, for the construction a new firehouse, after the original built in 1880 was destroyed by fire in 1888. The firehouse was designed by French, Dixon & DeSaldern in the Romanesque Revival style and was built in 1890 by M.J. Connolly (Mason) and John Meighan (Carpenter). In the early 1970's, the engine door was widened resulting in the removal of one of the cast-iron pilasters and the glass directly above the original door. The "Engine Co. No. 2" letters are original to the building. The firehouse was restored outside and modernized inside after a severe fire occurred in the 1980s. The firehouse currently houses Engine Company 5 and Ladder Company 1 of the Hoboken Fire Department. According to local legend, the firehouse was built 12 feet back from the building line to protect pedestrians from the tobacco spit of firefighters.

Design

The firehouse is a three-story example of Romanesque Revival style, with Richardsonian Romanesque influences. This was the first firehouse in Hoboken to incorporate a fire tower in the design of the building. The firehouse has a single chimney located on the northernmost wall. The main building material is tan stretcher bond brick. Bands of sandstone horizontally span the facade. The engine door has cast-iron pilasters on either side. A tower extends to four stories on the southern side of the building. The mansard roof and tower roof are covered in orange terra cotta-colored pantiles.

See also
National Register of Historic Places listings in Hudson County, New Jersey

References

External link

Buildings and structures in Hoboken, New Jersey
Fire stations completed in 1890
Fire stations on the National Register of Historic Places in New Jersey
National Register of Historic Places in Hudson County, New Jersey
New Jersey Register of Historic Places